Romania competed at the 2022 Winter Paralympics in Beijing, China which took place between 4–13 March 2022. Two competitors represented Romania and they have both represented Romania at the Winter Paralympics in the past: alpine skier Laura Văleanu competed in 2014 and snowboarder Mihăiță Papară competed in 2018.

Competitors
The following is the list of number of competitors participating at the Games per sport/discipline.

Alpine skiing

One alpine skier competed in alpine skiing.

Snowboarding

One snowboarder competed in snowboarding.

Snowboard cross

Qualification legend: Q - Qualify to next round; FA - Qualify to medal final; FB - Qualify to consolation final

See also
Romania at the Paralympics
Romania at the 2022 Winter Olympics

References

Nations at the 2022 Winter Paralympics
2022
Winter Paralympics